Ronald Charles Purcell (October 5, 1932 – September 7, 2011) was an American guitarist, with  degrees from the Los Angeles Conservatory of Music and California State University, Northridge.  He was Professor Emeritus of the Department of Music at California State University, Northridge and Director of the International Guitar Research Archive, considered one of the finest guitar archives in the world. His major teachers included Andrés Segovia, Emilio Pujol, Macario Santiago Kastner, Alirio Diaz and Mario Castelnuovo-Tedesco, whose Hommage to Purcell, Op. 170, No. 38 is dedicated to him.

Early life and career

Purcell was born in Santa Clara, California.  He studied music at the Los Angeles Conservatory of Music, earning a (Bachelor of Music degree in 1960, and California State University, Northridge, graduating from CSUN (then known as San Fernando Valley State College) with a masters degree in 1970.  Purcell joined the faculty at CSUN in 1971 and taught until his retirement in 2006.  He produced recordings with Klavier Records and El Maestro Records and published two books and numerous performance editions with Chanterelle, Warner/Chappell (formerly Belwin-Mills) and editions with Mel Bay Publishing Co. including the complete works of Miguel Llobet and works by Laurindo Almeida. Purcell wrote many scholarly journal articles, as well as books on Andres Segovia and Vahdah Olcott-Bickford. He served as the first president and later as a board member for the Guitar Foundation of America (GFA) and as editor for the American String Teachers Association, Guitar Division, ASTA Journal. He was the Chairman of the Board of Directors for the American Guitar Society and Director of the International Guitar Research Archives (IGRA), where he collected thousands of scores and archival materials. Purcell was elected Vice President to the Board of Directors for the Augustine Foundation in New York City.

Personal life

His first wife was Joanne B. Purcell, a professor of romance languages at the University of California, Davis until her death from cancer in 1984.  He married Beth Purcell in 1985.  Purcell had a son and two daughters, along with two stepchildren.

Death

Purcell died on September 7, 2011 at the age of 78 at his home in Sherman Oaks, California.

Legacy

An annual student fellowship and scholarship is given in Purcell's memory at California State University, Northridge.  The International Guitar Research Archives (IGRA), held in the University Library at California State University, Northridge, have grown since his death, with recent acquisitions of the Reginald Smith Brindle collection, the Guitar Foundation of America archive, and many others.

Honors
Chairman, Board of Directors, American Guitar Society.
Founder and Director, International Guitar Research Archive. (https://web.archive.org/web/20110719135326/http://library.csun.edu/igra/)
Vice President, Board of Directors, Augustine Foundation, NYC.
Former President and board member, Guitar Foundation of America
Former Editor,  ASTA Journal,  American String Teachers Association, Guitar Division,

References

External links
International Guitar Research Archive, California State University, Northridge

American classical guitarists
American male guitarists
California State University,  Northridge faculty
1932 births
2011 deaths
People from Santa Clara, California
20th-century American guitarists
20th-century American male musicians
20th-century classical musicians